Extra Innings is an album by the British band The Outfield. It features a total of fifteen tracks, including eleven songs from their fan-club release It Ain't Over... as well as some new recordings dating from shortly before the album's release in 1999. The version of "Lay Down" on Extra Innings is a combination of the It Ain't Over... songs "Lay Down" and "It Ain't Over".

Track listing
All tracks by John Spinks except where noted.

"Heaven's Little Angel" – 4:07 
"Lay Down" – 3:44 
"Certain Kinda' Love" – 3:57
"Kiss the Rain" – 3:51
"Girl of Mine" (Spinks, Lewis) – 4:10
"Midnight Moves" – 4:08
"Dance the Night Away" – 4:16
"Slow Motion" – 3:17
"Talking 'Bout Us" – 3:36
"My Girlfriend's Girlfriend" – 3:30
"One Love" – 4:47
"It's a Crime" – 4:26
"Chic Lorraine" – 4:08
"Out to Lunch" – 3:24 
"They Can't Knock You Down Again" – 4:52

Personnel 
Tony Lewis – vocals, bass
John Spinks – guitar, keyboard, vocals
Simon Dawson – drums, vocals

References

External links 
 

The Outfield albums
1999 albums